Safuneituʻuga Paʻaga Neri is a Samoan politician and former Cabinet Minister. She was the third Samoan woman ever appointed to Cabinet. She is a member of the Human Rights Protection Party.

Neri is from Safune on the island of Savaiʻi. She worked as an Education lecturer at the National University of Samoa. She was first elected to the Legislative Assembly of Samoa as an independent in the 2001 election. She was re-elected in the 2006 election, and was appointed Minister of Communication and Technology following the removal from office of Mulitalo Siafausa Vui. As Minister she planned the privatisation of the Samoa Broadcasting Corporation, and of SamoaTel.

She lost her seat in the 2011 election. She later served as a member of the Public Service Commission from 2012 - 2018.

References

Living people
Year of birth missing (living people)
Members of the Legislative Assembly of Samoa
Samoan chiefs
People from Gaga'ifomauga
Government ministers of Samoa
Human Rights Protection Party politicians
21st-century women politicians
Women government ministers of Samoa
Academic staff of the National University of Samoa